Duke Montana, stage name of Duke Barker, better known as Grind Muzik Rap King or The King of Rap is an Italian-American rapper, actor, author and businessman. He collaborated with several Italian and American rappers, including Snoop Dogg, Kool G Rap, Lil Ortega, Onyx, Club Dogo, Fabri Fibra, Wu-Tang Clan, Coolio, and Ice-T. He is the father of the Multi-Platinum producer Sick Luke.

Personal life and early career 
Duke Montana was born in Rome to an American father and Italian mother. In the early years of his life he lived in Santa Ana, Los Angeles. In the early 1990s, when he was fourteen, Montana founded his first hip-hop collective, Power Mc's, together with the producer Ice One and Julie P. with which he released the Power to the People LP. He also collaborated with important members of the American rap scene including Onyx, Ice-T, Wu-Tang Clan and starred in the film Le amiche del cuore, directed by Michele Placido, playing the role of himself. During those years he spent his life between Corpus Christii, London and finally Los Angeles. There he performed in many live concerts until 2000, when he finally settled in Italy.

Career 

In 2008 Duke Montana took part in the album Ministero dell'Inferno (2010), including collaborations with Italian rappers such as Club Dogo, Marracash, Fabri Fibra, and Noyz Narcos. During these years he performed in many concerts all around Italy and Switzerland. In 2011 he gave birth to the project "Black Bandana Click".

In 2011, Montana released the album Grind Music II, self-produced and distributed by Edel Music. In the same year he published his further album, Stay Gold, produced by Sick Luke. It included collaboration with the American hip-hop group Onyx ("Bloodsport"), Club Dogo ("Carta Viola"), Fabri Fibra ("Alphabet Killers"), and other mainstream and underground rappers. In 2012, he recorded the track "Smashin' (Italian Remix)" featuring Onyx and The Beatnuts. Currently he is the president of Golden Age Biz, his personal label, which has a partnership with Sony BMG for distribution and Live Nation Entertainment for his live tours. It also deals with the production of Black Barz and other emerging underground rappers. On the 15 July 2012, Montana opened the first and the only Italian date of the American rapper Wiz Khalifa, in Milan, together with Fedez.

Cinema
1992 – Le amiche del cuore directed by Michele Placido.
2016 – Zeta, film

Discography

Albums 
1991 – Power to the People (Power Mc's)
2000 – Atlantis Land - Virgin Records
2008 – Ministero dell'Inferno (Truceklan) - Propaganda Records
2008 – Street Mentality - Propaganda Records
2010 – Grind Muzik Mixtape - Propaganda Records
2012 – Grind Muzik II prod. Don Joe, Shablo, Sick Luke - Edel Music
2012 – Stay Gold prod. Don Joe and Sick Luke - Sony BMG
2013 – Black Barz Mixtape - Golden Age Label
2014 – Grind Muzik 3 Mixtape - Sony BMG
2016 – Raw - Sony BMG
2018 – Grind Muzik 4 - Kazal

Single tracks 
2000 – Atlantis World
2000 – Da Hip Hop Witch (soundtrack)
2006 – Lovin' Lola (Summer Hits 2006)
2009 – Diss Track feat. Truceklan

Collaborations

Notes 

Italian rappers
Underground rappers
Italian male pornographic film actors
1976 births
Living people
Italian people of American descent
Gangsta rappers
Male rappers
21st-century Italian musicians
20th-century Italian musicians
20th-century Italian male actors
21st-century Italian male actors
Male actors from Rome
Musicians from Rome
Male actors from Orange County, California
Rappers from California
People from Santa Ana, California
20th-century American male musicians
21st-century American male musicians